"Love Me to Death" is a song by Australian rock band Boom Crash Opera, released in 1988. It is the fifth and final single to be released from Boom Crash Opera's debut album Boom Crash Opera. It peaked at number 72 on the Kent Music Report.

Track listing 
7" single
 Love Me to Death (Peter Farnan, Richard Pleasance) - 3:55
 Bombshell (P. Farnan, R. Pleasance) - 3:47
12" single
 Love Me to Death (P. Farnan, R. Pleasance) - 4:25
 Fire Inside the Island (P. Farnan, R. Pleasance) - 3:27
 Bombshell (extended mix) (P. Farnan, R. Pleasance) - 6:03

Personnel 
 Peter Maslen – drums, vocals
 Greg O'Connor – keyboards
 Dale Ryder – lead vocals
 Richard Pleasance – guitar, bass, vocals
 Peter Farnan – guitar, vocals
Production
 Engineer – Will Gosling (tracks: 1 & 2)
 Producer – Alex Sadkin (tracks: 1 & 2)

Charts

Weekly charts

References

External links
Boom Crash Opera - Love Me to Death (7" single)
Boom Crash Opera - Love Me to Death (12" single)

1988 singles
1988 songs
Boom Crash Opera songs
Songs written by Richard Pleasance